Winchelsea is a small town in the county of East Sussex, England, located between the High Weald and the Romney Marsh, approximately  south west of Rye and  north east of Hastings. The current town, which was founded in 1288, replaced an earlier town of the same name, known as Old Winchelsea, that was lost to coastal erosion in the late medieval period. Winchelsea is part of the civil parish of Icklesham.

The mayor of Winchelsea is chosen each year from amongst the members of the corporation, who are known as freemen, rather than being elected by public vote. New freemen are themselves chosen by existing members of the corporation. Thus, in its current form, the corporation is effectively a relic of Winchelsea's days as a 'rotten borough' (when Winchelsea elected two MPs but the number of voters was restricted to about a dozen, sometimes fewer). The corporation lost its remaining civil and judicial powers in 1886 but was preserved as a charity by an Act of Parliament to maintain the membership of the Cinque Port Confederation. The mayor and corporation in Winchelsea now have a largely ceremonial role, together with responsibility for the ongoing care and maintenance of the main listed ancient monuments in the town and the Winchelsea museum.

Toponym
The name Winchelsea may be derived from the colloquial word 'qwent' that refers to the marshland behind the town and the Saxon word 'chesil' meaning shingle beach or embankment.

History

Old Winchelsea
Old Winchelsea was on a massive shingle bank that protected the confluence of the estuaries of the Rivers Brede, Rother and Tillingham and provided a sheltered anchorage called the Camber. The old town was recorded as Winceleseia in 1130 and Old Wynchchelse in 1321. The Normans used to call the place Wincenesel.

After the Norman Conquest, Winchelsea was of great importance in cross-Channel trade (acting in particular as an entrepôt for London) and as a naval base. In the 13th century, it became famous in the wine trade from Gascony.

There may have been, in the 1260s, over 700 houses, two churches and over 50 inns and taverns thus implying a population of thousands of people at the time. Prior to 1280 incursions by the sea destroyed much of the town until a massive flood completely destroyed it in 1287.

Winchelsea

In the late 13th century, the old town's population moved to the town's present location. In 1281 Edward I granted a charter for a planned town, based on a grid layout, to be built on higher ground on the western edge of edge Romney Marsh and Camber Sands. The names of the town planners are recorded as Henry le Waleys and Thomas Alard. The new town inherited the title of "Antient Town" from Old Winchelsea and retained its affiliation to the Cinque Ports confederation together with Rye and the five head-ports. 

The town had a tidal harbour on the River Brede. It flourished until the middle of the 14th century. It then suffered French and Spanish raids during the Hundred Years' War until the 15th century and was hit by the Black Death. In 1350, the Battle of Les Espagnols sur Mer was fought nearby. In 1360 the town was sacked and burnt by a French expeditionary force, sent in an unsuccessful attempt to retrieve their King John II of France captured at the Battle of Poitiers four years earlier. The town remained prosperous, although reduced in size until the 1520s. The silting of the harbour ultimately destroyed its prosperity. Camber Castle was built by Henry VIII in the early 16th century halfway between Winchelsea and Rye to guard the approach to the Camber. Much of the stone used in its construction may have been taken from the demolition of the Franciscan monastery of Greyfriars. Winchelsea was greatly involved in the wine trade with Guyenne and the extensive wine cellars under the town may still be visited on open days.

Winchelsea retains its medieval setting on a hill surrounded by largely empty marsh, the original layout of the planned town and the largest collection of medieval wine cellars in the country with the possible exception of Norwich and Southampton. It also retains three of the four town gates and several original buildings, including the parish church, which is dedicated to St Thomas the Martyr. Another church, St Leonard's, was later the site of a windmill, which was blown down in the Great Storm of 1987. Some of the original 13th/14th-century fortifications can still be seen at the Strand Gate and Pipewell or Ferry Gate. The scale of the original plan for New Winchelsea can be judged by the site of the "New Gate", over half a mile outside the current town.

Across the road from the churchyard stands the Court Hall, one of Winchelsea's oldest buildings, the lower floor once being the gaol. The first floor is now a museum, full of relics of the history of Winchelsea, the Corporation, and a model of the town. Nearby is the town well, dug in 1851 to save water being carried up the hill. It is thought to be 80 feet deep. At the foot of Strand Hill stands the town workhouse Strand House just behind the port area of Winchelsea which runs along the river bank on the far side of the main road. This area contains the remains of several old buildings, such as the Old Malt House and Appletree Wick while Strand House itself was built around 1425 according to dendrochronology. These buildings made up the workhouse of the parish of Winchelsea being known as "The Old Poor Houses". The area was a subject of archaeological investigation in 2013 which found the remains of the medieval wharf and a medieval boat next to the Bridge Inn.

Winchelsea stands on the main south coast road, the A259. The Royal Military Canal built in the early 19th century as a defence-line against the highly anticipated invasion by Napoleon Bonaparte passes the eastern side of the town and connects to the river Brede.

The town lends its name to the nearby seaside village of Winchelsea Beach.

Governance
In 2006 a group of local residents requested Rother District Council to review the parishing arrangements of Icklesham, with a view to creating a separate Winchelsea Parish.  The Parish of Winchelsea Action Group submitted a petition in favour from 228 electors.  Other survey and polling evidence suggest the residents of Winchelsea are in favour by a majority of up to 2–1, but that the remainder of Icklesham parish was against the idea by a wide margin. In the May 2007 parish council elections, the proposal for a separate parish council was the key issue. The three candidates supporting a separate parish for Winchelsea were elected by a clear majority in a record turnout of some 66% and the two opposing candidates (including a member of the Corporation and former councillor) were defeated.

Transport

The A259 road, a major road from Hastings to Folkestone, runs around the edge of the village. Stagecoach Group run a bus service from Hastings to Rye via Winchelsea.

Notable people
Vera Atkins (1908–2000), squadron leader of Special Operations Executive F Section, Col. Maurice Buckmaster's assistant at SOE, lived in Winchelsea after the Second World War.
Joseph Conrad (1857–1924), writer, lived for a time in a farmhouse called 'The Pent' as subtenant to Ford Madox Ford.
Ford Madox Ford (1873–1939), writer, moved to Winchelsea in 1901.
Henry Irving (1838–1905), actor, lived with Ellen Terry in a summer house in Winchelsea from 1892.
John Harris (c. 1666–1719), author and editor, was rector of Winchelsea.
Rod Hull (1935–1999), puppeteer, lived and died in Winchelsea.
Spike Milligan (1918–2002), comedian, writer, musician, poet, playwright, soldier and actor, lived near Winchelsea, and is buried in the churchyard of St Thomas's, Winchelsea.
Blanche Patch (1879–1966), author and secretary to George Bernard Shaw for 30 years. One of eleven brothers and sisters, she was the daughter of the Rector of St Thomas's, Winchelsea.
Eric Slater (1896–1963), artist and printmaker, lived in Winchelsea.
Sir Melford Stevenson PC (1902–1987), barrister and High Court Judge, lived in Winchelsea 1953–1987. His ashes are buried in the churchyard.
Ellen Terry (1847–1928), actress, bought and lived in a summer house called Tower Cottage in Winchelsea, beginning in 1892.
W.M. Thackeray (1811-1863), novelist, lived in Winchelsea for a time, and set his unfinished novel Denis Duval there.

See also
 List of former members of parliament
 Mayor of Winchelsea

References

External links

 Town Website
 Winchelsea Church Website
 
  Audio interview with local resident about life in the town.

 
Towns in East Sussex
Market towns in East Sussex
Cinque ports
Beaches of East Sussex
Icklesham